Jesper Urban Jansson (born 8 January 1971) is a Swedish former professional footballer who played as a defender or midfielder. He currently serves as the director of football at Hammarby IF.

As a player, he represented Östers IF, AIK, Djurgårdens IF, Stabæk, KRC Genk, Helsingborgs IF, and Högabergs BK during a club career that spanned between 1988 and 2007. He won one cap for the Sweden national team in 1994 and represented the Sweden Olympic team at the 1992 Summer Olympics.

Club career 
Jansson was the captain of AIK during the season 1994-1995. His move to rival club Djurgårdens IF in 1996 was not a popular one amongst fans especially for a hooligan firm associated with AIK called Firman Boys. After leaving the club Jansson received death threats and had his door painted orange (the color of Firman Boys) with the text Judas. One of the reasons for him subsequently leaving Djurgårdens IF in 1997 for Norwegian club Stabæk Fotball was because of this intimidation. Even after moving to another country and securing a protected identity he would still go on to receive threats. 

He was a part of the Helsingborgs IF team that eliminated Inter Milan to qualify for the 2000–01 UEFA Champions League.

International career 
Jansson was a member of the Sweden Olympic football team at the 1992 Summer Olympics in Barcelona. Jansson earned one cap for the Sweden national team, making his only appearance in 1994 in a Joe Robbie Cup match against the United States.

Post-playing career 
After retiring, Jansson was the general manager at Helsingborgs IF between 2008 and 2014. In 2015, he was appointed head scout at F.C. Copenhagen, but left a year later. On 28 April 2017, Jansson was appointed director of football of Hammarby IF.

Personal life 
Jansson is the brother of former professional footballer Ulrik Jansson and the father of the professional footballer Kevin Höög Jansson.

Career statistics

References

External links

1971 births
Living people
People from Växjö
Sportspeople from Kronoberg County
Swedish footballers
Sweden international footballers
Sweden youth international footballers
Association football defenders
Association football midfielders
Olympic footballers of Sweden
Footballers at the 1992 Summer Olympics
Östers IF players
AIK Fotboll players
Djurgårdens IF Fotboll players
Helsingborgs IF players
Stabæk Fotball players
K.R.C. Genk players
Högaborgs BK players
Allsvenskan players
Eliteserien players
Belgian Pro League players
Hammarby Fotboll directors and chairmen
Swedish expatriate footballers
Swedish expatriate sportspeople in Belgium
Expatriate footballers in Norway
Swedish expatriate sportspeople in Norway
Expatriate footballers in Belgium